Sir Dennis Young (1936 – March 2008) was the acting governor-general of Papua New Guinea in 1991. He was Speaker of the Assembly when Serei Eri resigned his position as governor-general on October 1, 1991. Young served as acting governor-general until the selection of Wiwa Korowi on November 18, 1991.

Young was born in England in 1936. He served as the Speaker of the National Parliament of Papua New Guinea from August 1982 to October 1982 and from November 1987 to July 1992.

He was knighted in the 1999 New Year Honours for his public service. Young died from a heart attack in Milne Bay in March 2008.

References 

1936 births
2008 deaths
Governors-General of Papua New Guinea
Speakers of the National Parliament of Papua New Guinea